JobStreet.com Pte Ltd is a Malaysian company. It was founded in 1997, it is now Southeast Asia's largest online employment company, according to Forbes. The company through its employment website of the same name, currently serves about 80,000 corporate customers and 11 million jobseekers. Even as early as in July 2010, the Group services over 60,000 corporate customers and over 7 million jobseekers.

It became a public listed entity in 2004 when parent company JobStreet Corporation Berhad was listed on the MESDAQ Market of Bursa Malaysia Securities on 29 Nov 2004. Thereafter, JobStreet.com was listed on the Main Board in October 2007, under stock short name, JOBST. JobStreet owns 22.43% of the Taiwanese online employment provider 104 Corporation, 21.13% of the online marketing technology and services company, Innity Corporation and the automotive portal, Autoworld.com.my. As of 2016, the total revenue of jobstreet in the Philippines is PHP 2.04 Billion.

In November 2014, JobStreet became part of the Australian Stock Exchange-listed SEEK Limited.

Products and services
The website features a job matching engine named LiNa for jobseekers and a job posting platform named SiVa for employers.
The firm also provides other online recruitment products and services such as online recruitment, outsourced human capital service, software as a service (SaaS), e-commerce & e-business and jobseekers' services. Classified advertisement also serves as secondary revenue sources for JobStreet.

The firm also provide resources for jobseekers' career growth. Among these are the JobStreet.com English Language Assessment, the JobStreet.com Resume & Interview assessments, salary reports, and JobStreet Blog, (fondly called as BlogStreet, now defunct).

History
Envisioned to provide an automated platform for accurately matching employers and jobseekers, JobStreet was founded by Mark Chang Mun Kee as a spin-off of MOL.com in 1995. The starting capital of JobStreet was reportedly US$2.6 million back then. Prior to that, its parent company MOL AccessPortal was sold to Vincent Tan, the CEO of Berjaya Group for US$3.2 million. Conservative management helped the company sidestep the dot-com bust in 2000s. In 1999, San Francisco venture capital firm Walden International and Sumitomo Corporation Capital Asia made $1.6 million investment in the company and increased its stake in JobStreet to 30% in 2001. Walden catalyzed JobStreet's move from a start-up to a regional major market player. It urged Mark Chang to hire executives with business experience, to expand to other key Southeast Asia countries and to trim cost.

The following table summarizes the growth in jobseeker and corporate customers of JobStreet.

Corporate affairs
JobStreet.com was selected by Forbes Asia as Best 200 Under a Billion company in 2007 and 2008. In April 2013, it crossed the RM1 billion market capitalization milestone. 
Following its purchase of 10.1% stake in 2008 for $19.3 million and another 11.2% stake for RM70.9 million in 2010, SEEK Limited, the Australian internet job recruitment company made a complete takeover in 2014 for RM 1.73 billion together with co-investors, News Corp, Tiger Global and Macquarie Capital.

See also
 Employment website

References

1997 establishments in Malaysia
MSC Malaysia
Employment websites
Malaysian websites
Business services companies established in 1997
2014 mergers and acquisitions
Companies based in Kuala Lumpur
Privately held companies of Malaysia
Companies formerly listed on MESDAQ
Online companies of Malaysia